This is a list of events that happened in 2006 in Mexico.

Incumbents

Federal government

President
 President
Vicente Fox , until November 30
Felipe Calderón , starting December 1

Cabinet

 Interior Secretary (SEGOB)
Santiago Creel, until November 30
Francisco Javier Ramírez Acuña, starting December 1
 Secretary of Foreign Affairs (SRE)
Luis Ernesto Derbez, until November 30
Patricia Espinosa, starting December 1
 Communications Secretary (SCT)
Pedro Cerisola, until November 30
Luis Téllez, starting December 1
 Education Secretary (SEP)
Reyes Tamez, until November 30
Josefina Vázquez Mota, starting December 1
 Secretary of Defense (SEDENA)
Gerardo Clemente Vega, until November 30
Guillermo Galván Galván, starting December 1
 Secretary of Navy (SEMAR)
Marco Antonio Peyrot González, until November 30
Mariano Francisco Saynez Mendoza, starting December 1
 Secretary of Labor and Social Welfare (STPS)
Francisco Javier Salazar Sáenz, until November 30
Javier Lozano Alarcón, starting December 1
 Secretary of Welfare (SEDESOL)
Josefina Vázquez Mota, until November 30
Beatriz Zavala, starting December 1
 Tourism Secretary (SECTUR): Rodolfo Elizondo Torres
 Secretary of the Environment (SEMARNAT)
José Luis Luege Tamargo, until November 30
Juan Rafael Elvira Quesada, starting December 1
 Secretary of Health (SALUD)
Julio Frenk, until November 30
José Ángel Córdova, starting December 1
Secretary of Public Security (SSP)
Eduardo Medina-Mora Icaza, until November 30
Genaro García Luna, starting December 1
Secretary of Finance and Public Credit (SHCP)
Francisco Gil Díaz, until November 30
Agustín Carstens, starting December 1
Secretariat of Energy (Mexico) (SENER): Georgina Yamilet Kessel Martínez, starting December 1
Secretary of Agriculture (SAGARPA): Alberto Cárdenas, starting December 1
Secretary of Public Function (FUNCIÓN PÚBLICA): German Martínez Cázares, starting December 1
Secretary of Agrarian Reform (SRA): Germán Martínez, starting December 1
Attorney General of Mexico (PRG)
Daniel Cabeza de Vaca, until November 30
Eduardo Medina-Mora Icaza, starting December 1

Supreme Court

 President of the Supreme Court: Mariano Azuela Güitrón

Governors

 Aguascalientes: Luis Armando Reynoso 
 Baja California: Eugenio Elorduy Walther 
 Baja California Sur: Narciso Agúndez Montaño 
 Campeche: Jorge Carlos Hurtado Valdez 
 Chiapas
Pablo Salazar Mendiguchía , until December 7
Juan Sabines Guerrero, (Coalition for the Good of All), starting December 8
 Chihuahua: José Reyes Baeza Terrazas 
 Coahuila: Humberto Moreira 
 Colima: Gustavo Vázquez Montes 
 Durango: Ismael Hernández 
 Guanajuato
Juan Carlos Romero Hicks , until September 25
Juan Manuel Oliva , starting September 26
 Guerrero: Zeferino Torreblanca 
 Hidalgo: Miguel Ángel Osorio Chong 
 Jalisco
Alberto Cárdenas , until November 20
Gerardo Solís Gómez , substitute governor
 State of Mexico: Enrique Peña Nieto 
 Michoacán: Lázaro Cárdenas Batel 
 Morelos
Sergio Estrada Cajigal Ramírez , until October 1.
Marco Antonio Adame , starting October 1.
 Nayarit: Ney González Sánchez
 Nuevo León: Fernando Canales Clariond 
 Oaxaca: Ulises Ruiz Ortiz 
 Puebla: Mario Plutarco Marín Torres 
 Querétaro: Francisco Garrido Patrón 
 Quintana Roo: Félix González Canto 
 San Luis Potosí: Jesús Marcelo de los Santos 
 Sinaloa: Juan S. Millán , until December 31
 Sonora: Eduardo Bours 
 Tabasco: Manuel Andrade Díaz , until December 31
 Tamaulipas: Eugenio Hernández Flores 
 Tlaxcala: Alfonso Sánchez Anaya 
 Veracruz: Fidel Herrera Beltrán 
 Yucatán: Víctor Cervera Pacheco 
 Zacatecas: Amalia García 
Head of Government of the Federal District
Alejandro Encinas Rodríguez , until December 4
Marcelo Ebrard , starting December 5

Events

 The Broad Progressive Front is founded
 The Garros Galería is established. 
 The Televisa Law is approved.
 The Sierra de Huautla Biosphere Reserve is declared by the UNESCO in Morelos.
 The Biosphere Reserve of Huatulco is declared by the UNESCO in Oaxaca.
 January: The Other Campaign 
 January 25: Juana Barraza is apprehended. 
 February 4: Sheraton Maria Isabel Hotel and Towers incident.
 February 19: Pasta de Conchos mine disaster
 March: Santiago Mexquititlán raid
 April 10: 2006 Mexico DC-9 drug bust 
 April 17: Maltrata bus crash 
 May: Jojutla crater discovered on Mars by astronomer Andres Eloy Martínez Rojas.
 May 3: 2006 civil unrest in San Salvador Atenco 
 May 27: Eutelsat 113 West A is launched. 
 June 17: Popular Assembly of the Peoples of Oaxaca
 June 27: Ángel Albino Corzo International Airport inaugurated.
 June 28: Miss Latin America 2006 held in Riviera Maya.
 September 2: Nuestra Belleza México 2006 
 September 16: the Faro del Comercio is re-inaugurated. 
 November 10: The government of Mexico City approves a law on civil unions, becoming the first local government to allow same sex unions in Mexico.
 December 11: Beginning of the Mexican Drug War
unknown date: Galia Moss, a Latin American sailor crosses the Atlantic Ocean alone.

Elections

 2006 Mexican general election
 2006 Chiapas state election 
 2006 Colima state election
 2006 Mexican Federal District election
 2006 Guanajuato state election 
 2006 Jalisco state election 
 2006 Nuevo León state election 
 2006 Sonora state election 
 2006 State of Mexico election 
 2006 Tabasco state election

Awards

	
Belisario Domínguez Medal of Honor	- Jesús Kumate Rodríguez
Order of the Aztec Eagle	
National Prize for Arts and Sciences	
National Public Administration Prize	
Ohtli Award
 Pete Gallego
 Buddy Garcia
 Ignacio E. Lozano, Jr.
 Ed Pastor
 Jared Polis
 Santiago Wood

Popular culture

Sports 

 Primera División de México Clausura 2006
 Primera División de México Apertura 2006 
 2006 InterLiga 
 2005 Copa Sudamericana Finals 
 Mexico compete at the 2006 FIFA World Cup in Germany. 
 Vuelta Chihuahua Internacional 
 2006 Desafío Corona season 
 2006 Gran Premio Telmex 
 2006 Rally México 
 2006 Mexican Figure Skating Championships 
 Homenaje a Dos Leyendas (2006) 
 2006 Centrobasket Women in Mexico City. 
 2006 Men's Pan-American Volleyball Cup in Baja California. 
 Mexico at the 2006 Winter Paralympics

Music

Film

 Una película de huevos
 Efectos secundarios – September 1
 Pretendiendo
 Pan's Labyrinth – October 2
 Así del precipicio
 Cansada de besar sapos – December

Literature

TV

Telenovelas
 Heridas de Amor
 La fea más bella
 Código postal – May 22

Notable deaths
 January 1 – Mapita Cortés, 75, Puerto Rican -born actress of the cinema of Mexico
 January 13 – Raúl Anguiano, 90, painter and muralist, heart failure.
 February 10 – Juan Soriano, 85, painter and sculptor.
 March 7 – Ludwik Margules, 72, theatre director, cancer. 
 March 29 – Salvador Elizondo, 73, writer. 
 April 5 – Armando Labra, 62, economist. 
 April 20 – Miguel Zacarías Nogaim, 101, film director. 
 April 30 – Beatriz Sheridan, 71, actress and director, heart attack.
 May 4 – Valentin Trujillo, 55, actor, heart attack.
 May 22 – Lilia Prado, 78, actress, multiple organ failure. 
 May 23 – Ángel Fernández, 80, sports broadcaster, renal failure.
July 15  – Raúl Delgado Benavides, politician, Municipal president (Cuautitlán, Jalisco); murdered
 August 4 – Julio Galán, 47, painter
 September 15 – Pablo Santos, 19, actor 
 October 9 – Mario Moya Palencia, 73, politician, heart attack.
 October 24 – Rafael Ramírez Heredia, 67, writer, lung cancer. 
 November 1 – Daniel García "Huracán Ramírez", 80, wrestler, heart attack. 
 November 6 – Miguel Aceves Mejía, 90, singer, bronchitis. 
 November 19 – Francisco Quirós Hermosillo, General. Cancer. 
 November 23 – Jesús Blancornelas, 70, journalist, cancer.

See also 
 2006 Oaxaca protests

References

External links